German submarine U-344 was a Type VIIC U-boat of Nazi Germany's Kriegsmarine during World War II.

She was a member of two wolfpacks.

She was on her third patrol when she was sunk by a British aircraft on 22 August 1944.

She sank one warship.

Design
German Type VIIC submarines were preceded by the shorter Type VIIB submarines. U-344 had a displacement of  when at the surface and  while submerged. She had two shafts and two  propellers.

U-344 was fitted with five  torpedo tubes (four fitted at the bow and one at the stern), fourteen torpedoes, one  SK C/35 naval gun, 220 rounds, and two twin  C/30 anti-aircraft guns. The boat had a complement of between forty-four and sixty.

Service history
The submarine was laid down on 7 May 1942 at the Nordseewerke yard at Emden as yard number 216, launched on 29 January 1943 and commissioned on 26 March under the command of Kapitänleutnant Ulrich Pietsch.

U-344 served with the 8th U-boat Flotilla, for training and the 3rd flotilla for operations from 1 April 1944. She was reassigned to the 11th flotilla on 1 June 1944.

First patrol
U-344 had sailed from Kiel in Germany to Flekkefjord (west of Kristiansand) and then Bergen in Norway in April and May 1944, but her first patrol began when she departed Bergen on 20 May and followed the Norwegian coastline. She arrived at Narvik on the 27th.

Second patrol
Her second foray involved criss-crossing the Norwegian Sea. At one point she passed east of Jan Mayen Island. She arrived at Bogenbucht (west of Narvik) on 8 July 1944.

Third patrol and loss
Having departed Bogenbucht on 3 August 1944, she sank the British sloop  in the Barents Sea on the 21st. Of 226 crew, nine men survived the icy water. Fifty men died in the sinking; there were no survivors.

Previously recorded fate

Wolfpacks
U-344 took part in two wolfpacks, namely:
 Trutz (2 June – 6 July 1944)
 Trutz (17 – 22 August 1944)

Summary of raiding history

References

Notes

Citations

Bibliography

External links
 

German Type VIIC submarines
U-boats commissioned in 1943
U-boats sunk in 1944
U-boats sunk by British aircraft
U-boats sunk by depth charges
World War II submarines of Germany
World War II shipwrecks in the Arctic Ocean
1943 ships
Ships built in Emden
Ships lost with all hands
Maritime incidents in August 1944